The Southwestern League is a high school athletic league that is part of the CIF Southern Section. Members are located in the southwestern Riverside County cities of Murrieta and Temecula.

Members
 Chaparral High School
 Great Oak High School (Temecula, California)
 Murrieta Mesa High School
 Murrieta Valley High School
 Temecula Valley High School
 Vista Murrieta High School

References

CIF Southern Section leagues